Deiopea kaloktenota is a species of ctenophore in the family Eurhamphaeidae. It is the only species in the monotypic genus Deiopea.

References

Lobata